Nadya Shatarova (born 2 July 1960) is a Bulgarian gymnast. She competed in six events at the 1976 Summer Olympics.

References

1960 births
Living people
Bulgarian female artistic gymnasts
Olympic gymnasts of Bulgaria
Gymnasts at the 1976 Summer Olympics
Place of birth missing (living people)